A by-election was held for the New South Wales Legislative Assembly electorate of West Sydney on 2 March 1870 because of the resignation of John Robertson due to financial difficulties.

Dates

Result

The by-election was caused by the resignation of John Robertson due to financial difficulties.

See also
 Electoral results for the district of West Sydney
List of New South Wales state by-elections

References

1870 elections in Australia
New South Wales state by-elections
1870s in New South Wales